Phantasmagoria is a form of horror theater using an optical device to display moving images.

Phantasmagoria may also refer to:

Music 
 Phantasmagoria (band), a Japanese rock band
 Phantasmagoria (Curved Air album) or the title song, 1972
 Phantasmagoria (The Damned album), 1985
 Phantasmagoria (Limbonic Art album) or the title song, 2010
 Phantasmagoria, an album by Nobuo Uematsu, 1994
 "Phantasmagoria", a song by Annihilator from Never, Neverland, 1990
 "Phantasmagoria", a song by Melt-Banana from Cell-Scape, 2003

Other uses 
 Phantasmagoria (audio drama), a 1999 audio drama based on Doctor Who
 "Phantasmagoria" (poem), an 1869 poem by Lewis Carroll
 Phantasmagoria (video game), a 1995 point-and-click adventure horror game
 Phantasmagoria: The Visions of Lewis Carroll, an unfinished film project by Marilyn Manson
 ORFN or Phantasmagoria, Aaron Curry (1974–2016), American graffiti artist

See also 

 
 
 Fantasmagoria, an Argentine band
 Fantasmagoriana, an 1812 French anthology of German ghost stories
 Phantasm (disambiguation)
 Fantasmagorie (disambiguation)